Justice Andrews may refer to:

George Andrews (judge) (1826–1889), justice of the Tennessee Supreme Court
Charles Andrews (judge) (1827–1918), chief judge of the New York Court of Appeals
Harold A. Andrews (fl. 1950s), justice of the Rhode Island Supreme Court
Lorrin Andrews (1795–1868), justice of the Supreme Court of Hawaii
Richard Bullock Andrews (1823–1884), justice of the Supreme Court of South Australia
Thomas G. Andrews (judge) (1892–1942), justice of the Oklahoma Supreme Court
William Shankland Andrews (1858–1936), judge of the New York Court of Appeals

See also
Judge Andrews (disambiguation)
Andrew Justice (1951–2005), British rower